Josiah Forshall (29 March 1795 – 18 December 1863) was an English librarian.

Life
Forshall was born at Witney, Oxfordshire on 29 March 1795, the eldest son of Samuel Forshall. He received education at the grammar schools of Exeter and Chester, and in 1814 entered Exeter College, Oxford. He graduated B.A. in 1818, taking a first class in mathematics and a second in literae humaniores. He became M.A. in 1821, and was elected fellow and tutor of his college.

Forshall was appointed an assistant librarian in the manuscript department of the British Museum in 1824, and became keeper of that department in 1827. In 1828 he was elected a Fellow of the Royal Society.

In 1828 Forshall was appointed secretary to the Museum, and in 1837 resigned his keepership in order to devote himself exclusively to his secretarial duties. He was examined before the select committee appointed to inquire into the Museum in 1835–6, and made revelations on the subject of patronage. As secretary he had much influence with the trustees. He was opposed to any attempts to make the Museum more accessible.

About 1850 Forshall retired from the museum on account of ill-health. After his resignation he lived in retirement, spending much of his time, until his death, at the Foundling Hospital, of which he had been appointed chaplain in 1829. He died at his house in Woburn Place, London, on 18 December 1863, after undergoing a surgical operation.

Works
Forshall edited the catalogue of the manuscripts in the British Museum (new series): pt. i. the Arundel MSS.; pt. ii. the Burney MSS.; pt. iii. index, 1834, &c. fol., and also the Catalogus Codicum Manuscriptorum Orientalium: Pars Prima Codices Syriacos et Carshunicos amplectens, 1838, &c. fol. He also edited the Description of the Greek Papyri in the Brit. Mus., pt. i. 1839, 8vo.

In 1850 he published a pamphlet entitled Misrepresentations of H.M. Commissioners [who inquired into the British Museum in 1848–9] exposed. He published with Frederic Madden The Holy Bible … in the earliest English Versions made by John Wycliffe and his followers, 1850, 4 vols., a work of two decades. He also published editions of the Gospels of St. Mark (1862), St. Luke (1860), and St. John (1859), arranged in parts and sections, and some sermons. His works The Lord's Prayer with various readings and critical notes (1864), and The First Twelve Chapters of … St. Matthew in the received Greek text, with readings and notes, 1864, were published posthumously.

References

English librarians
Fellows of the Royal Society
People from Oxfordshire
Alumni of Exeter College, Oxford
Fellows of Exeter College, Oxford
19th-century British educators
1795 births
1863 deaths
People from Witney